Marmara affirmata is a moth of the family Gracillariidae. It is known from Peru.

References

Marmarinae
Moths described in 1918